Balvi District was an administrative division of Latvia, located in Latgale region, in the country's east. It was organized into two cities and nineteen parishes, each with a local government authority. The main city in the district was Balvi.

History 
Until 1940, the area was a part of the Abrene County of the Republic of Latvia. After the Soviet occupation of Latvia in 1940, six parishes of the county and the town of Abrene were transferred to the Pskov Oblast of the Russian SFSR. In 1945, the remaining part was renamed Viļaka County. Ultimately, districts were introduced in 1949 by the Soviet occupation authorities to supersede counties – the Viļaka County was split into Abrene (dissolved in 1959) and Balvi District.

Districts were eliminated during the administrative-territorial reform in 2009. Balvi District was split into Balvi Municipality, Baltinava Municipality, Rugāji Municipality and Viļaka Municipality.

Cities and parishes in the Balvi District 

 Baltinava Parish
 Balvi city
 Balvi Parish
 Bērzkalne Parish
 Bērzpils Parish
 Briežuciems Parish
 Krišjāņi Parish
 Kubuli Parish
 Kuprava Parish
 Lazdukalns Parish
 Lazduleja Parish
 Medņeva Parish
 Rugāji Parish
 Susāji Parish
 Šķilbēni Parish
 Tilža Parish
 Vectilža Parish
 Vecumi Parish
 Viļaka city
 Vīksna Parish
 Žīguri Parish

References 

Districts of Latvia
Balvi Municipality